This is a list of Brazilian television related events from 1986.

Events

Debuts
June 30 - Xou da Xuxa (1986-1992)

Television shows

1970s
Turma da Mônica (1976–present)

Ending this year
Balão Mágico (1983-1986)
Sítio do Picapau Amarelo (1977–1986)

Births
29 April - Monique Alfradique, actress
14 June - Klebber Toledo, actor & model
14 September - Giovanna Ewbank, actress & model
9 December - Bruno Gissoni, actor

Deaths

See also
1986 in Brazil